The 2018 UNAF U-15 Tournament (Tunisia) was the third edition of the UNAF U-15 Tournament. The tournament took place in Tunisia from 3 to 7 November 2018.

Participants

Venues

Tournament

Goalscorers
3 goals

 Adil Boulbina
 Mawhoub El-Mahdi

2 goals

 Mohamed Rayane Gacem
 Mohamed Amine Sahel

1 goal

 Abdelali Hammadi
 Yacine Titraoui
 Mohamed Al-Khatheer
 Mohamed Saad
 Mohamed El-Hailouli
 Moataz Kifaia
 Adem Saidi

References

External links
 اتحاد شمال افريقيا ينظم من 2 الى 7 نوفمبر دورة منتخبات تحت 15 عاما - UNAF official website

2018 in African football
2018
2018
2018 in Tunisian sport